Vera's treefrog (Litoria verae) is a species of frog in the subfamily Pelodryadinae. It is endemic to West Papua, Indonesia. Its natural habitats are subtropical or tropical moist lowland forests, intermittent rivers, shrub-dominated wetlands, and swamps. It is threatened by habitat loss.

References

Litoria
Amphibians of Western New Guinea
Amphibians described in 2004
Taxonomy articles created by Polbot